The Stits SA-11A Playmate is a homebuilt aircraft design that features a rapid wing-folding mechanism for trailering or storage.

Design
The SA-11A is a single engine, side-by-side configuration seating, tricycle gear, strut-braced, low wing monoplane. The fuselage is welded steel tubing with aircraft fabric covering. The wings have a quick release mechanism that allows them to fold and lock alongside the fuselage in 15–30 seconds. Safety mechanisms were put in place so pilots could visually inspect that the wings were locked in place. A small sideways seat in the rear can accommodate  of luggage or a light passenger.

Operational history
The prototype was donated by Ray Stits in 1969 to the EAA AirVenture Museum in Oshkosh, Wisconsin. Its engine went into the Stits SA-9A "Skycoupe" prototype for testing and development.

Specifications (SA-11A Playmate)

See also

References

Homebuilt aircraft
Low-wing aircraft
Single-engined tractor aircraft